Rick Lalonde (born February 19, 1955) is a Canadian former professional ice hockey player who played in the World Hockey Association (WHA). Lalonde played two games with the San Diego Mariners during the 1975–76 WHA season. He was drafted by the Mariners in the seventh round of the 1975 WHA Amateur Draft. As a youth, he and teammates Rychard Campeau and Denis Meloche played in the 1963 and 1964 Quebec International Pee-Wee Hockey Tournaments with minor ice hockey teams in Ville-Émard and Saint-Jean-de-Matha, Quebec.

References

External links

1955 births
Living people
Calgary Centennials players
Canadian ice hockey coaches
Canadian ice hockey defencemen
Ice hockey people from Ottawa
San Diego Mariners draft picks
San Diego Mariners players
Tidewater Sharks players
Winston-Salem Polar Twins (SHL) players